Polohy Raion is one of the 5 raions (districts) of Zaporizhzhia Oblast in southern Ukraine. The administrative center of the region is the town of Polohy. Population: .

The district was established in accordance with the resolution of the Verkhovna Rada of Ukraine № 807-IX of July 17, 2020. It included: urban hromadas: Tokmatska, Huliaipilska, Orikhivska, Polohivska, Molochanska and the following rural hromadas: Bilmatska, Komysh-Zoryanska, Rozivska settlements, Vozdvyzhivska, Malynivska, Smyrnovska, Malotokmachanska, Preobrazhenska, Voskresenska, Fedoralni territories.

On 18 July 2020, as part of the administrative reform of Ukraine, the number of raions of Zaporizhzhia Oblast was reduced to five, and the area of Polohy Raion was significantly expanded.  The January 2020 estimate of the raion population was

References

Raions of Zaporizhzhia Oblast
1923 establishments in Ukraine